Syncarpella is a genus of fungi in the family Cucurbitariaceae.

References

External links
Index Fungorum

Pleosporales